Georgios Benos (born 29 March 1964) is a Greek football manager.

References

1964 births
Living people
Greek football managers
Leonidio F.C. managers
Kalamata F.C. managers
Kavala F.C. managers
Trikala F.C. managers
A.E. Sparta P.A.E. managers
Sportspeople from Kalamata